Sandy Hill is a constituency of the Anguillan House of Assembly. The incumbent is Cora Richardson-Hodge of the Anguilla United Front.

Representatives
From 2000 to 2010, the seat was held by Osbourne Fleming as Chief Minister of Anguilla.

Election results

Elections in the 2020s

|- class="vcard" 
  | style="background-color:"|
  | class="org" style="width: 130px" | AUF
  | class="fn" | Cora Richardson-Hodge
  | style="text-align:right;" | 318
  | style="text-align:right;" | 51.3
  | style="text-align:right;" | -9.7

Elections in the 2010s

Elections in the 2000s

Elections in the 1990s

Elections in the 1980s

Constituencies of the Anguillan House of Assembly